The 2004–05 OK Liga was the 36th season of the top-tier league of rink hockey in Spain.

Barcelona Sorli Discau finished the league as champion.

Competition format
Sixteen teams joined the league.

The eight first teams at the end of the regular season qualified for the playoffs while the three last teams were relegated to Primera División.

Regular season

Playoffs
Quarterfinals were played with a best-of-three format, while semifinals and final were played with a best-of-five series.

Seeded teams played games 1, 2 and 5 of the series at home.

Final standings

Copa del Rey

The 2005 Copa del Rey was the 62nd edition of the Spanish men's roller hockey cup. It was played in Reus between the eight first qualified teams after the first half of the season.

Barcelona Sorli Discau won the title.

References

External links
Real Federación Española de Patinaje

OK Liga seasons
2004 in roller hockey
2005 in roller hockey
2004 in Spanish sport
2005 in Spanish sport